This article presents a list of U.S. states sorted by number of light vehicles per capita; the vehicle figures are per 1,000 people.

2015 rankings 
Sources:

2017 rankings 
Sources:

See also
List of countries by vehicles per capita

References

External links

Office of Highway Policy Information 2015 Statistics

vehicles per capita
Vehicles Per Capita
Car-related lists
United States, vehicles